The following is a list of radio stations in the Canadian territory of Northwest Territories, .

See also 
 Lists of radio stations in North and Central America

External links
Canadian Communications Foundation - History of Radio stations in the Northwest Territories

Northwest Territories
Radio stations